In Medias Res is a studio album by the German symphonic metal band Krypteria, released in 2005. The album was released as an enhanced CD, which includes two video tracks: "Victoriam Speramus", "Get the Hell Out of My Way".

The album name (Latin for Into the middle of things) reflects the fact, that the band considers In Medias Res their first album, while the band has worked together as Krypteria since 2001.

In Medias Res peaked at position 66 on the German albums chart and at position 86 in Austria.

Track listing

Credits
Ji-In Cho – vocals, piano
Christoph Siemons – guitars, keyboards
Frank Stumvoll – bass, backing vocals 
S.C. Kuschnerus – drums, backing vocals, lead vocals on "You & I"

References

Krypteria albums
2005 albums